Whiskey Blanket is an Alternative hip hop trio from Boulder, Colorado, formed in 2003. The group is made up of emcee and violinist Sloppy Joe (Joe Lessard), emcee and cellist Funny Biz (Jordan Polovina), and emcee, turntableist, and producer Steakhouse (Steven Pampel). All three members are classically trained musicians, and they regularly incorporate live piano, cello, and violin into their performances and recordings, combining elements of Jazz and Classical music with Hip Hop.

Discography

It's Warmer Down Here (2004)
Credible Forces (2007)
No Object (2010)
Collection I (2012)
 From the Dead of Dark (2013)

References

American hip hop groups
Alternative hip hop groups
American musical trios
Musical groups from Colorado
2003 establishments in the United States